Franklin Library may refer to:

 The Franklin Library, a book publishing part of the Franklin Mint
 Franklin Library (Minneapolis), a public library on Franklin Avenue in Minneapolis, Minnesota, United States
 Franklin Public Library (Massachusetts), the oldest public library in existence in the United States